Knud Knudsen is the name of:

 Knud Knudsen (linguist) (1812–1895), Norwegian linguist
 Knud Knudsen (photographer) (1832–1915), professional photographer
 Knud Leonard Knudsen (1879–1954), gymnast
 Knud Christian Knudsen (1887–1969), Norwegian merchant and politician